Sidmouth is a town on the English Channel in Devon, South West England,  southeast of Exeter.  With a population of 12,569 in 2011, it is a tourist resort and a gateway to the Jurassic Coast World Heritage Site. A large part of the town has been designated a conservation area.

History

The origins of Sidmouth pre-date recorded history.  The Sid valley has been in human occupation since at least the Iron Age as attested by the presence of Sidbury Castle, and possibly earlier given the presence of Bronze Age burial mounds on Gittisham Hill  and Broad Down.  The village of Sidbury itself is known to be Saxon in origin with the Church crypt dating to the seventh century. However, the Sid Valley was divided into two ecclesiastical land holdings, with Sidbury and Salcombe Regis being gifted by King Athelstan to Exeter Cathedral, and Sidmouth, which was part of the manor of Otterton, was gifted by Gytha Thorkelsdóttir (the mother of King Harold Godwinson) to the Benedictines at Mont-Saint-Michel.

Sidmouth appears in the Domesday Book of 1086 as Sedemuda, meaning "mouth of the Sid". Like many such settlements, it was originally a fishing village.

By the 1200s, Sidmouth had expanded to become a market town of similar size to Sidbury and generating more income for the abbot of Mont-Saint-Michel than Otterton. By this time, Sidmouth already had a parish church, as the Otterton Cartulary refers to a grant of 30 acres of land to Guilielmas, the vicar in Sidmouth, as a glebe, and excavations in 2009 during the remodelling of the parish church revealed foundations dating from that time. It is likely that the church was already dedicated to St Giles, as the annual fair was held on his feast day 1 September. According to one of the many blue plaques found around Sidmouth, not far from the church was a chapel dedicated to St Peter built sometime before 1322, the remaining wall of which is now part of Dukes Hotel.

During the 14th century, Sidmouth enjoyed a degree of prosperity from the wine trade and, as part of the manor of Otterton, was transferred by King Henry V from Mont-Saint-Michel to Syon Abbey. King Henry VIII confiscated it again during the dissolution of the monasteries and sold it off, whereafter it changed hands several times before being acquired by the Mainwaring baronets, whose family provided two of the vicars of Sidmouth parish.

Although attempts have been made to construct a harbour, none has succeeded. A lack of shelter in the bay prevented the town's growth as a port. Despite this, a part of the town is known as 'Port Royal' which is likely due to the town's having provided two ships and 67 men to King Edward III during the Hundred Years' War with which to attack Calais. The most concerted effort was a short-lived attempt in the 1830s at the west of the seafront; this included the construction of the Sidmouth Harbour Railway along the seafront and into a tunnel at the cliffs to the east that would have transported stone from Hook Ebb. Only a few traces of the railway and tunnel survive today.

According to one of the Sid Vale Association Blue Plaques, a fort was built in Sidmouth in 1628, due to fear of a French invasion or naval attack, on the part of the seafront that is known as 'Fortfield' and which is now the cricket pitch.

Another of the Blue Plaques of the Sid Vale Association, confirms that the Old Ship pub (now a Costa Coffee) had operated as a tavern in Sidmouth since the 1400s and was used by smugglers. The infamous Jack Rattenbury, who was born nearby in Beer, Devon operated in the area, and was known to associate with the Mutter family of Ladram Bay (after whom Mutter's Moor on Peak Hill overlooking Sidmouth is named).

Sidmouth remained a village until the fashion for coastal resorts grew in the Georgian and Victorian periods of the 18th and 19th centuries. A number of Georgian and Regency buildings still remain. In 1819, George III's son Edward, Duke of Kent, his wife, and baby daughter (the future Queen Victoria) came to stay at Woolbrook Glen for a few weeks. In less than a month he had died from an illness. The house later became the Royal Glen Hotel; a plaque on an exterior wall records the visit. Sidmouth was connected to the railway network in 1874, by a branch line from Sidmouth Junction, which from there called at Ottery St Mary and Tipton St John. This was dismantled in 1967 as a result of the Beeching Axe.

In 2008, Canadian millionaire Keith Owen, who had been on holiday in the town and planned to retire there, bequeathed about £2.3 million to the community's civic society, the Sid Vale Association, upon learning that he had only weeks to live due to lung cancer. The bequest was used as a capital fund to generate an annual interest dividend of around £120,000 for community projects.

Demographics
At the 2011 census the population was 12,569, with a median age of 59.

Geography

Sidmouth lies at the mouth of the River Sid in a valley between Peak Hill to the west and Salcombe Hill to the east. It is surrounded by the East Devon Area of Outstanding Natural Beauty and is on the Jurassic Coast, a World Heritage Site, and the South West Coast Path. The red-coloured rock indicates the arid conditions of the Triassic geological period.

Erosion of the cliffs to the east of the river mouth threatens homes and the coastal footpath, and is a serious concern.

The wide esplanade has been a prominent feature since Regency times. A series of southwesterly storms in the early 1990s washed away much of the shingle beach protecting the masonry. A set of artificial rock islands was constructed to protect the sea front, and tons of pebbles were trucked in to replace the beach.

Sidmouth has a number of conservation projects, notably the arboretum which in 2012 designated all land owned by Sidmouth Town Council as 'civic arboretum', the first town in the United Kingdom to do so.

Climate
The highest temperature recorded since 1990 in Sidmouth is 28 °C (82 °F) in July 2018, and the coldest is -5 °C (23 °F) in February 1991 and March 2018.

Transport
Sidmouth's main road access is via the A3052 coast road.

Irregular bus services connect to Exeter up to every half-hour by Stagecoach South West and to Honiton or Seaton. 
Sidmouth is also served by AVMT Buses' service 899, which runs from Seaton to Sidmouth via Beer and Branscombe .

Since the closure of the Sidmouth Railway in 1967, the nearest railway stations are Feniton, Honiton or Whimple, all on the West of England line.

Government
Sidmouth has its own town council, presided over by a chair elected from councillors. There are eight wards, with 19 councillors in all. The town clerk is the senior paid officer, with a team of full-time and part-time staff. The town is responsible for many of the locally run services, including the information centre. Sidmouth lies within the areas of East Devon District Council and Devon County Council. The electorate of the Sidmouth ward at the 2011 census was 13,737.

Sidmouth was in the Honiton parliamentary constituency from its recreation in 1885 until its abolition in 1997, since when it has been in the East Devon constituency.

Culture

Churches and museums
The parish church is dedicated to St Giles and St Nicholas. It was rebuilt in 1860; the architect was William White. Of the medieval structure, only the 15th-century tower has been retained. Oddments of Norman and later stonework were included in the rebuilding. Features of interest include the Duke of Kent Memorial Window, which Queen Victoria gave in 1867, and the reredos by Samuel Sanders Teulon. Parts of the original fabric, such as the windows, were reused by the historian Peter Orlando Hutchinson in building a folly adjoining his house. He was also responsible for saving the stained glass in the vestry. The folly is the Old Chancel in Coburg Terrace which was started by Hutchinson in 1859, in protest over the destruction of the original church fabric during rebuilding.

The museum, next to the church, has local memorabilia, historical artefacts, and geological samples.

The church of All Saints, also Anglican (Taylor, architect, 1837), is in the Early English style with lancet windows and "oddly clumsy" pinnacles. There were also Unitarian, Wesleyan (later Methodist) and Congregational chapels; the Unitarian chapel was founded in the 17th century by Presbyterians and the Wesleyan and Congregational ones in 1837 and 1846 respectively.

After the Reformation, the Catholic Church returned to Sidmouth in 1880 with the arrival of exiled French Jesuits who were joined in 1881 by the Sisters of the Assumption. The convent erected a purpose built chapel which opened for public mass in 1884. By the 1920s the Catholic population had grown to require a parish church. Land at Radway was acquired in 1930 and the Church of the Most Precious Blood was built, with the first Mass being celebrated on 10 November 1935.

Sidmouth is home to the Norman Lockyer Observatory and Planetarium, located on Salcombe Hill. The facility, completed in 1912, fell into disuse but was saved from demolition by the appeals of enthusiasts to East Devon District Council. The observatory now operates as a science education project and is open to the public.

Music

Folk Week

Sidmouth Folk Week is an annual folk festival in early August attracting musicians and visitors. It became less financially viable over the years and in 2005 the last of the commercial sponsors, essential for its existence, pulled out. To continue the tradition, individuals grouped together to form Sidmouth FolkWeek Productions, a limited company. Since the change of format, the event has been held on a smaller scale, with no arena at the Knowle, though marquees are still erected in the Blackmore Gardens and The Ham at the eastern end of the town. The popular late-night extra feature is also run at Bulverton on the edge of Sidmouth next to the main campsite.

Sidmouth Town Band
During the summer, Sidmouth Town Band, a brass band, play a series of concerts in the Connaught Gardens each Sunday at 8pm from late May until early September. The earliest record of the band is from a photograph of 1862.

In 2010, during competition, it was crowned West of England Champion in the third section. It went on to win third prize at the national finals of Great Britain. In 2011, it retained its West of England Champion title, becoming one of only a handful of bands to win back-to-back titles, and was promoted to the second section from 2012. From 2017 the band was promoted to the First Section.

Literary associations 
Sidmouth has featured in various literary works, e.g. as "Stymouth" in Beatrix Potter's children's story The Tale of Little Pig Robinson (1930), in which the author included views of the beach and other parts of the Devon countryside. In Thomas Hardy's Wessex it is the inspiration for "Idmouth". "Baymouth" in William Makepeace Thackeray's Pendennis, and "Spudmouth" in The Merry Adventures of Robin Hood by Howard Pyle, are both based on the town. In G. A. Henty's book With Wolfe in Canada, the hero James Walsham is from Sidmouth, and parts at the beginning and end of the book take place there. The poet Elizabeth Barrett lived in the town from 1832 until 1835. The area of rock pools around Jacob's Ladder is used as the location for H. G. Wells' The Sea Raiders. In 1962, author R. F. Delderfield had a house, 'Dove Cottage' (now 'Gazebo'), built on Peak Hill.

J.R.R. Tolkien was a regular visitor to Sidmouth and wrote parts of the early part of Lord of the Rings while on holiday with his family in 1938. Chapters drafted during the holiday encompass the hobbits escape of the Shire through the Old Forest and up to their arrival at Bree.

It was a favourite spot for Sir John Betjeman. He chose it as the subject of the first programme of the television series John Betjeman in the West Country that he wrote and presented in 1962. The script takes the form of an extended poem and was republished in 2000 as a short book.

Sidmouth has been the setting for television dramas, such as a 1987 adaptation of William Trevor's novel The Children of Dynmouth, and  an ITV adaptation of Agatha Christie's Marple in summer 2005.

Miscellaneous
The Sidmouth Herald is the local newspaper.

Manor Pavilion houses an arts centre and a theatre that hosts both amateur and professional productions. There is also the Radway Cinema.

Sidmouth has been a frequent winner of Britain in Bloom awards. Most recently it won the Small Town category in 2001 and the Coastal Resort category in 2005.

The Sid Vale Association, the first civic society in Britain, was founded in 1846 and is based in Sidmouth.

In 2016, a worldwide architectural competition was held in the town to provide ideas for the future redevelopment of Sidmouth's eastern town and seafront. The competition was initiated by Sidmouth Architect Henry Beech Mole.

In October 2018, it was discovered that an unusually large  fatberg was constricting the sewers. A team of scientists from the University of Exeter studied it and attributed it to the ageing population and its food habits. It was removed and turned into energy at a local power plant.

Twin towns
Sidmouth is twinned with Le Locle in Switzerland.

Features
The Esplanade is the sea front road from the red cliffs of Salcombe Hill in the east towards Jacob's Ladder Beach at the west. Peak Hill can be seen in the distance.

Jacob's Ladder is a series of wooden steps leading up to Connaught Gardens from Jacob's Ladder Beach and its red cliffs.

Connaught Gardens date from around 1820. They were named after the Duke of Connaught, the third son of Queen Victoria, who officially opened the gardens in 1934. The bandstand there is used by bands in many weeks of the summer season.

This grassy slope up and along Peak Hill follows the red cliffs above Jacob's Ladder Beach. It provides a wide view eastwards over the whole town towards Salcombe Hill.

Economy
The principal revenue is from tourism, with a wide range of hotels and guest houses, as well as self catering accommodation in the local area. Sidmouth is a retirement location, so pensioner spending is another source of income.

The largest employer is East Devon District Council, the headquarters of which are at the former Knowle Hotel. The headquarters were transferred to Honiton in 2019. There is a large independent department store, Fields of Sidmouth, which has been on the same site for over 200 years. There are pubs, restaurants, coffee houses and tea rooms; also an indoor swimming pool, a sports hall at the leisure centre, and a golf course.

Education

Sidmouth College is a comprehensive school which takes children aged between 11 and 18 from as far afield as Exmouth and Exeter. In February 2012, with 852 pupils on the roll, the college was deemed 'Good' by Ofsted. The judgment of improvement in the college's provision followed the previous inspection (May 2009) when it was deemed 'satisfactory'. In the 2005 Ofsted report, when there were 869 students on the roll, it was also deemed 'satisfactory'.

Sidmouth College is situated in the Sid Valley. It admits students from East Devon.

There is one state junior school, which takes children from between the ages of 8 and 11. There are two state infant schools. There is, additionally, a private school: St John's International School (formerly known as the Convent of the Assumption) which takes children from two to 18, including overseas boarders. In 2007, it was taken over by International Education Systems (IES).

Sidmouth International School is an English language school for foreign pupils.

Notable people
 Stuart Hughes (politician)
 Edmund Leach (1910–1989), social anthropologist
 Adolph Friedrich Lindemann (1836–1931), engineer, lived at Sidholme mansion
 R. W. Sampson

References

External links

 Official Sidmouth Tourism and Town Website
 Sidmouth Town Council
 
 Rock fall at Pennington Point near Sidmouth February 2009 British Geological Survey

 
Towns in Devon
Beaches of Devon
Jurassic Coast
Seaside resorts in England